Michał Renusz (born October 18, 1987 in Malbork) is a Polish football midfielder who plays for Zatoka Puck.

Career

Club
In March 2009, following extended health problems, Jagiellonia loaned him out to Supraślanka Supraśl in order to regain fitness.

In July 2011, he joined Górnik Łęczna.

References

External links
 

1987 births
Living people
Polish footballers
Jagiellonia Białystok players
OKS Stomil Olsztyn players
Górnik Łęczna players
GKS Bełchatów players
Arka Gdynia players
Bałtyk Gdynia players
Gryf Wejherowo players
People from Malbork
Sportspeople from Pomeranian Voivodeship
Association football midfielders